SK Benešov is a Czech football club located in Benešov. The team currently plays in the Bohemian Football League, the third tier of the Czech football system.

History
In the 1994–95 season the club played in the Czech First League, the top flight of Czech football. The club started with three wins and a draw from the first six matches, but was beset by financial problems. The owner and only sponsor of the club, Miroslav Švarc, was taken into police custody on charges of financial criminality, team coach Jaroslav Hřebík left after the first half of the season, and the players were not paid between October and February.

Benešov's results did not improve and club captain Tibor Mičinec cited the club's financial situation as the reason for a run of 24 games without a win. As a result, the team were relegated to the Czech 2. Liga for the 1995–96 season, but fell further, spending the 2000s in the Czech Fourth Division.

In June 2014 the club was promoted to the Bohemian Football League under the coach Luboš Zákostelský.

Historical names
 1913: AFK Benešov
 1929: Benešovský SK
 ca. 1940: Slavoj Benešov
 1948: Sokol Benešov
 1949: Sokol ČSD Benešov
 1953: TJ Lokomotíva Benešov
 1971: TJ ČSAD Benešov
 1990: FK Švarc Benešov
 1996: FK Benešov
 1999: SK Benešov

History in domestic competitions

 Seasons spent at Level 1 of the football league system: 1
 Seasons spent at Level 2 of the football league system: 4
 Seasons spent at Level 3 of the football league system: 5
 Seasons spent at Level 4 of the football league system: 12

References

External links
  

Football clubs in the Czech Republic
Association football clubs established in 1913
Czech First League clubs
Benešov
1913 establishments in Austria-Hungary
20th-century establishments in Bohemia